A Dead Man Among the Living (Czech: Mrtvý mezi živými) is a 1949 Czech thriller film directed by Bořivoj Zeman and starring Karel Höger, Eduard Dubský and Vjaceslav Irmanov. The film is based on the 1931 novel To levende og en død by the Norwegian writer Sigurd Christiansen. Following an armed robbery at his office, a postal worker suffers a crisis of conscience.

Cast
 Karel Höger - Jirí Valta - postal assistant 
 Eduard Dubský - Robert Munk - postal assistant 
 Vjaceslav Irmanov -  Cyril Popov - musician (as Václav Irmanov) 
 Zdenka Procházková - Helena Fejfarová - gardener 
 Lída Matousková - Marta Klecková 
 Jana Hrdličková - Jana Klecková - daughter 
 Radim Nikodém - Ivo Fejfar - son 
 Vladimír Řepa - Inspector 
 František Klika - Chief 
 Milos Hájek - Emil Klecka - postal auditor 
 Frantisek Šlégl - Karel Fejfar - sergeant major 
 Zdeňka Baldová - Mr. Fejfarová 
 Rudolf Deyl - Officer 
 Blažena Slavíčková - Official 
 Jindřich Láznička - Postal attendant 
 Stanislav Neumann - Postal attendant at train 
 Josef Belský - Major 
 Josef Chvalina -  Police officer 
 Bohus Hradil -  Officer at postal management 1 
 Ferdinand Jarkovský - Officer at postal management 2 
 Josef Horánek -  Officer at postal management 3 
 J.O. Martin -  Post director 
 Anna Kadeřábková - Girl at gardening 
 Václav Švec - Rescuer 
 Milivoj Uzelac - Conductor 
 Vlasta Jelínková - Mr. Gabrielová 
 Vladimír Ráž - Officer at package postal 
 Jaroslav Štercl - Member of singer choir

See also
 To levende og en død (1937)
 Two Living, One Dead (1961)

References

Bibliography
 Soila, Tytti & Söderbergh-Widding, Astrid & Iverson, Gunnar. Nordic National Cinemas. Routledge, 1998.

External links

1949 films
1940s Czech-language films
Films based on Norwegian novels
Remakes of Norwegian films
1940s thriller films
Czech thriller films
Czechoslovak black-and-white films
1940s Czech films
Czechoslovak thriller films